Cyprois is a genus of crustaceans belonging to the family Notodromadidae.

The species of this genus are found in Europe and Northern America.

Species:
 Cyprois marginata (Straus, 1821) 
 Cyprois occidentalis Sars, 1926

References

Podocopida
Podocopida genera